Pēpēōpae is a bog on the island of Molokai in Hawaii.

Description
Poorly draining acidic soil leaches of nutrients, rainfall that exceeds , cooler temperatures and high winds have resulted in a bog where the canopy has been reduced to plants that are only inches above the ground. Typical forest canopy trees such as ōhia lehua (Metrosideros polymorpha) and ōlapa (Cheirodendron trigynum) can be found as groundcover, crawling along the surface.

Pēpēōpae bog is home to several endemic and endangered plant and animal species, including the Hawaii bog violet (Viola maviensis), alani (Melicope spp.), sedges,  lepelepe a moa (Selaginella arbuscula), among many others. Endemic Drosophila species, wingless flies, and damselflies can also be found in the bog.

The bog is contained within The Nature Conservancy's Kamakou Preserve, and access to the boardwalk is limited to scheduled guided tours, due to the fragile nature of the ecosystem and extreme risk due to introduced alien species.

In the Hawaiian language, pēpē ōpae means "shrimp crushed".

References

External links

Wetlands of Hawaii
Protected areas of Molokai
Landforms of Molokai
Nature reserves in Hawaii
Geography of Molokai